Owen Brian Toon (born May 26, 1947 in Bethesda, Maryland)  is a professor of atmospheric and oceanic sciences.  He is a fellow at the Laboratory for Atmospheric and Space Physics (LASP) at the University of Colorado Boulder. He received an A.B. in physics at the University of California, Berkeley in 1969 and a Ph.D. in physics at Cornell University in 1975 under Carl Sagan. His research interests are in cloud physics, atmospheric chemistry, and radiative transfer. He also works on comparing Earth and other planets such as Venus.

His research on the asteroid impact that killed the dinosaurs led to the discovery of nuclear winter due to the major decrease in temperature. The effects of nuclear winter were re-examined in a 2006 presentation at the annual meeting of the American Geophysical Union in San Francisco, where Toon and colleagues found that even a regional nuclear war could prove deadly for a large number of people. They calculated that as few as fifty detonations of Hiroshima-size bombs could kill as many as twenty million people, although it would not produce a nuclear winter. The atmospheric effects of a regional nuclear war would last several years, and would be strongest at mid-latitudes, including the United States and Europe.

He was elected a fellow of the American Meteorological Society in 1990, and a fellow of the American Geophysical Union in 1992.  He received the 2011 Roger Revelle Medal from the American Geophysical Union.

In 2022, Toon was among eight recipients of the 2022 Future of Life Award. The honor was bestowed upon Toon for "reducing the risk of nuclear war by developing and popularizing the science of nuclear winter."

Selected publications

References

External links
 Brian Toon faculty homepage

Cornell University alumni
UC Berkeley College of Letters and Science alumni
1947 births
Living people
University of Colorado faculty
Fellows of the American Geophysical Union
Date of birth missing (living people)
Atmospheric chemists
Carl-Gustaf Rossby Research Medal recipients
Fellows of the American Meteorological Society
Planetary scientists